Abdramane Ladji Diarra (born July 9, 1988, in Bobo-Dioulasso) is a Burkinabe football player who currently plays for Guinean side AS Kaloum Star.

Career 
Diarra started his senior career with Etoile Filante Ouagadougou, before joined to Portuguese club F.C. Paços de Ferreira. He played only few games in the reserve and was in January 2010 loaned to S.C. Beira-Mar. Diarra returned on 30 May 2010 to Pacos and was loaned out, for the second time now to G.D. Tourizense. After one season with Tourizense in the Portuguese Second Division and the return to Pacos, was released by the Portuguese Liga Sangres side. After his resign with F.C. Paços de Ferreira moved to Chinese club Chengdu Blades F.C.

He played before joined to Algerian Ligue Professionnelle 1 side MC El Eulma for Chinese side Chengdu Blades F.C.

Honours
 Burkinabé Premier League: 2007–08

References

1988 births
Living people
Burkinabé footballers
Burkina Faso international footballers
Expatriate footballers in Portugal
Burkinabé expatriate sportspeople in Portugal
People from Bobo-Dioulasso
MC El Eulma players
Association football forwards
F.C. Paços de Ferreira players
Expatriate footballers in China
G.D. Tourizense players
Primeira Liga players
S.C. Beira-Mar players
Expatriate footballers in Algeria
Burkinabé expatriate sportspeople in Algeria
Étoile Filante de Ouagadougou players
Burkinabé expatriate sportspeople in China
Chengdu Tiancheng F.C. players
Expatriate footballers in Guinea
Burkinabé expatriate sportspeople in Guinea
21st-century Burkinabé people